Goentoer Darjono Stadium is a football stadium in the town of Purbalingga, Indonesia. The stadium has a capacity of 15,000 people.

It is the home base of Persibangga Purbalingga .

References

Sports venues in Indonesia
Football venues in Indonesia
Multi-purpose stadiums in Indonesia
2009 establishments in Indonesia
Sports venues completed in 2009